James Kerwin,  (born October 13, 1973) is an American film director, theatre director, and screenwriter.

Education and academics 
Kerwin, who was born in St. Louis, Missouri, attended Parkway Central High School in Chesterfield.

Kerwin graduated with a film degree from Texas Christian University in 1995 and a minor in astronomy and physics. He served as a lab instructor and guest artist at T.C.U. and the University of Texas at Austin.  

He is a member of Phi Beta Kappa and Mensa, and is a Fellow of the Royal Society of Arts.

Career
Kerwin has been noted for his Shakespearean adaptations of A Midsummer Night's Dream, Cardenio and Venus and Adonis. In 2003 he staged Amber Benson's play Albert Hall in Los Angeles, California. In the early 2000s he was a frequent guest director for Daniel Henning and Noah Wyle's Blank Theatre Company and for Travis Schuldt's Lone Star Ensemble. Other projects include the "sci-fi noir" film Yesterday Was a Lie with Kipleigh Brown and Chase Masterson, which earned a number of prizes on the film festival circuit in 2008 and 2009. He and Brown again collaborated on Star Trek Continues, on which Kerwin served as writer/director from 2014-2017.

In 2020, Kerwin and actress Nicola Bryant co-hosted the video podcast In Isolation.

The MMORPG Star Trek Online features Kerwin as a non-player character, voiced by actor Jordan Reynolds.

Personal life
Kerwin's nieces—Elara and Rhea Kerwin—portrayed Summer Newman on The Young and the Restless.

In 2012, Kerwin was named one of the "Top Hunks in Science Fiction" in a readers' poll conducted by Hugo Award-winning fanzine StarShipSofa.

References

External links
 
 Official site

American film directors
Hispanic and Latino American film directors
Hispanic and Latino American writers
American theatre directors
Texas Christian University alumni
1973 births
Living people
Mensans
Parkway Central High School alumni